Crosstrap is a 1962 British B-movie crime film, starring Laurence Payne, Jill Adams and Gary Cockrell, and marking the directorial debut of Robert Hartford-Davis. The screenplay was adapted from a novel by John Newton Chance. The film was reportedly unusually graphic for its time in its on-screen depiction of violence, with one reviewer describing a "climactic blood-bath where corpses bite the dust as freely as Indians in a John Ford western".

Plot
Novelist Geoff (Cockrell) and his wife Sally (Adams) rent an isolated countryside bungalow to enable Geoff to finish his latest book without the distractions of life in London. On their arrival, they are horrified to find a dead man in the property; before they can report the discovery they are confronted by Duke (Payne), a gangland boss, and his henchmen who have, it transpires, been using the empty property as a hide-out for stolen valuables which they are planning to smuggle out of the country. A rival gangster, Juan (Derek Sydney), also has his eye on the goods and has discovered their whereabouts. The dead man is one of his minions.

Geoff and Sally are held captive, and matters take a turn for the worse when Juan and his men also arrive on the scene, forcing a stand-off between the two factions during which Geoff and Sally are roughly-treated by both sides. Duke starts to fall for Sally, and his obvious interest in her antagonises his girlfriend Rina (Zena Marshall). Eventually there is a bloody shoot-out between the rival gangs, with Duke's men getting the better of the exchange. Duke and his gang board the plane to make good their escape with the valuables, but the plane is shot at before takeoff by the jealous and vengeful Rina, first shooting the pilot and then hitting the fuel tank, after which the plane bursts into flames, killing all 4 people on board.

Cast
 Laurence Payne as Duke
 Jill Adams as Sally
 Gary Cockrell as Geoff
 Zena Marshall as Rina
 Bill Nagy as Gaunt
 Robert Cawdron as Joe
 Larry Taylor as Peron
 Max Faulkner as Ricky
 Derek Sydney as Juan
 Michael Turner as Hoagy

Reception
Crosstrap appears to have received a mainly negative critical reception, with verdicts such as "overacted, ludicrous and amateurish" (Monthly Film Bulletin) and "brawny but brainless" (Kine Weekly). The Daily Cinema was less dismissive, labelling it an "incredible but lively tale of gang-warfare, packed with hearty action and intrigue, plus a spot of sex for flavour" offering "robust ... programme support".

Later history
Crosstrap was originally released to cinemas as a supporting film in January 1962 by Unifilms Ltd. Unusually for a supporting feature, it was later picked up by Monarch Films for another cinema outing as a double-bill feature in 1967, possibly as a result of the success of that year's Night of the Big Heat, another film adapted from a Newton Chance novel. There was no record of the film after this point. There was no indication that it was ever shown on television in the UK, and attempts to trace a print of the film proved fruitless for decades.

Crosstrap is viewed with great interest by film historians as the debut of Hartford-Davis, who would go on to direct a number of cult 1960s films which pushed the boundaries of what was acceptable at the time in terms of sexual content (That Kind of Girl, The Yellow Teddy Bears) or violence (Corruption), alongside others that provide a very time-specific depiction of Swinging London (Saturday Night Out, The Sandwich Man). It was one of two Hartford-Davis films—the other being Nobody Ordered Love (1971)—that the British Film Institute (BFI) included on its "75 Most Wanted" list of missing British feature films.

However, the BFI reported that a black-and-white negative of the film was discovered in the early 2010s and digitally scanned. It was screened on Talking Pictures TV on 9 March 2018 and 3 October 2019. It is also available for screening on the BFI player website.

See also
List of rediscovered films

References

External links 
 
 
 Crosstrap at BFI Film & TV Database

1962 films
1962 crime films
British crime films
Films directed by Robert Hartford-Davis
British black-and-white films
Films based on British novels
1960s rediscovered films
1962 directorial debut films
Rediscovered British films
1960s English-language films
1960s British films